The Voice Israel (Season 2)  is the second season of the reality show The Voice Israel, which focuses on finding the next Israeli pop star. It is hosted by Michael Aloni with coaches Shlomi Shabat, Sarit Hadad, Aviv Geffen and Mashina.  Lina Makhul was declared the winner, with Ofir Ben Shitrit as runner-up.

Summary of competitors

Competitors' table
 – Winner
 – Runner-up
 – 2nd/3rd Runner-up
 – Eliminated

Result Tables

The Blind Auditions

Episode 1 

The coaches performed "אין מקום אחר"  at the start of the show.

Episode 2

Episode 3

Episode 4

Episode 5

Episode 6

Episode 7

Episode 8

Episode 8: Extra Round

Episode 9: before the battles
episode before the battles

Episodes 10–15: Battle Rounds 
 – Battle Winner

Episodes 16–17: Top 24 

At this stage of the competition, each mentor chose the contestants from his team to move on to the Top 20. However, the others mentors had the opportunity to press their "My Voice" button while the fourth mentor's contestant was singing. A contestants who all the others mentors gave him "their voice" moved on automatically to the Top 20.

Sarit Team

Yuval and Shlomi Team

Shlomi Team

Aviv Team

Episodes 18–19: Top 20 - "Going to the Edge" 

Each mentor chose the contestants from his team to move on to the Top 16, with the same "My Voice" button switch.

Sarit Team

Aviv Team

Yuval and Shlomi Team

Shlomi Team

Episodes 20–21: Top 16 - "The Coaches' Songs" 
The contestants had to sing songs which are originally performed by the other mentors. Each mentor chose the contestants from their team to move on to the Top 12, without the twist of "My Voice" button.

Episodes 22–23: Top 12 - Quarter finals 
The Top 8 contestants to move on to the semi-finals were chosen only by the audience's votes.

Episodes 24–25: Top 8 - Semi finals 
The Top 4 contestants to move on to the final were chosen only by the audience's votes.

Round 1 - Shlomo Artzi's Songs

The contestants sang songs by the Israeli artist Shlomo Artzi.

Round 2

Episode 26: Top 4 - The final

Round 1

Round 2 - Duets with the coaches

Round 3 - The Final Solo

Episode 27: 20 most loveable performances

3 most loveable performances from the final

External links
 The Voice Israel Official website

The Voice Israel seasons
2012 Israeli television seasons
2013 Israeli television seasons